Hardin Independent School District is a public school district based in Hardin, Texas, United States.  In addition to Hardin, the district also serves the unincorporated areas of Moss Hill, Romayor, and Rye.

In 2010, the school district was rated "recognized" by the Texas Education Agency.

History
In fall 2022 the district changed to a schedule where most months have school only four days per week, but that during August, September, January, and May, school is held for five days per week.

Schools

High school
3A
Hardin High (grades 9–12)

Intermediate schools
Hardin Junior High (grades 7–8)
Hardin Intermediate (grades 5–6)

Elementary schools
Hardin Elementary (prekindergarten-grade 4)

References

External links
Hardin ISD

School districts in Liberty County, Texas